Lavoisier Maia Sobrinho (9 October 1928 – 11 October 2021) was a Brazilian physician and politician. He served as governor of Rio Grande do Norte, from 1979 to 1983.

References 

1928 births
2021 deaths
Brazilian physicians
Governors of Rio Grande do Norte
Brazilian Socialist Party politicians
Brazilian Social Democracy Party politicians
Members of the Federal Senate (Brazil)
Members of the Chamber of Deputies (Brazil) from Rio Grande do Norte
Democratic Labour Party (Brazil) politicians
Democrats (Brazil) politicians
Democratic Social Party politicians